Brian Grosz was a singer/songwriter from Greenwich, Connecticut who plays deranged-alt folk reminiscent of Tom Waits, Mark Lanegan and PJ Harvey.

He attended Vassar College for a degree in theater where he played in the bands Skabba the Hut and Conquistador with current The Bravery frontman/songwriter Sam Endicott and keyboard-player John Conway, CSI: Miami actor Jonathan Togo.  After disbanding, Brian formed the hard-rock/post-hardcore band Dogs of Winter - a group that caught attention for its cover of Chris Isaak classic, "Wicked Game."

He released his first full length solo album Bedlam Nights in 2007 through Exotic Recordings.  This album featured guest performances from Matt Whyte (Earl Greyhound), Meredith DiMenna (Saint Bernadette), Keith Saunders (Saint Bernadette), Dave Valle (Dogs of Winter), Ryan Dowd (Dogs of Winter), Joe Novelli (J DiMenna ), Brian Satz (Len Xiang), Catherine Cavella (Roomtone) & Earl Maneein (Resolution 15).

In January 2008, Grosz will be releasing the EP "A Minor Work" under the project moniker, The Priestess and The Fool  - a duets project of cover songs that he sings with Meredith DiMenna of Saint Bernadette.

On May 14, 2019, Brian died in Austin Texas.

Discography
"What's Up Fireball," Conquistador, 2002

"Van Helsing's Curse, Oculus Infernum," as 'Voice of the Entity'  (Koch Records), 2003

"Cut Down To The Quick," Dogs of Winter (Exotic Recordings), 2005

"Thumbscrews/Wicked Game (single)," Dogs of Winter (Exotic Recordings), 2005

"Bedlam Nights," Brian Grosz (Exotic Recordings), 2007

"A Minor Work," The Priestess and The Fool (Exotic Recordings), 2008

"Ride On, Santa," The Priestess and The Fool (Exotic Recordings), 2008

External links
 The Brian Grosz MySpace Profile

Vassar College alumni
American male singer-songwriters
American singer-songwriters